Départment des Landes was a corvette of the French Navy, launched in 1804. She was damaged in 1814 and subsequently decommissioned. She was finally broken up around 1829-30.

Origins
Départment des Landes was built to a design by Pierre Rolland (cadet). The Ministry of Marine originally ordered her on 21
February 1803 under the name Égérie. However, on 13 August the Département des Landes offered to give the government a corvette. The Ministry ordered a corvette that day at Bayonne, but on 20 January 1804 cancelled the order. Instead, the Department took responsibility for the payment to complete Égérie, and the corvette was named for the Department.

Career
The other three were the 40-gun , the 18-gun corvette , and the 16-gun .<re></ref>

On 14 August, the 74-gun, third rate  was in the Channel Fleet when she saw a sail to eastward and three sail to westward. The lone sail was Faune, which trailed behind her squadron and had lost contact with it.

Deeming that waiting for Torche entailed accepting battle against the overwhelming British forces, Baudin ordered his squadron to take whatever actions were necessary for their security. Goliath caught up with Torche, which struck after a few shots from Goliath. Topaze and Départment-des-Landes escaped.

On 29 September Départment des Landes, under the command of Captain Joseph-François Raoul, was sailing off Guadeloupe when she encountered , a gun-brig of 16 guns.

Unable to maneuver, Maria took two broadsides. The French called on Lieutenant James Bennett, Marias captain, to surrender. He refused and three grapeshot from the next broadside killed him. The master, Joseph Dyason, then continued the combat but eventually had to strike. Maria had suffered six men killed, including Bennett, and nine wounded. The French had suffered at most a couple of men wounded. After the French had gotten all their prisoners off Maria, the prize crew had to run her aground to prevent her from sinking due to the damage she had sustained. The French provided a cartel to Dominica to permit Dyason to report the loss to Rear-Admiral Alexander Cochrane. The French later refloated Maria and she was taken into the French Navy under her existing name.

Fate
Départment des Landes was entering Brest on 13 September 1814 when she struck a rock. She was refloated but did not sail again. The French Navy decommissioned her on 30 November. She was condemned at Brest in 1820 and removed from the list of active warships. The Ministry of Marine ordered her broken up on 29 October 1829. She was subsequently broken up between December 1829 and February 1830.

Notes, citations and references

Notes

Citations

References
Fonds Marine. Campagnes (opérations; divisions et stations navales; missions diverses). Inventaire de la sous-série Marine BB4. Tome premier: BB210 à 482 (1805-18826) 
 
 
 
  
 

1804 ships
Maritime incidents in 1814
Corvettes of the French Navy